Gregory A. Baca (born May 14, 1971) is an American attorney and politician who has served as a member of the New Mexico Senate since January 2017.

Early life and education
Born and raised in Belen, New Mexico, Baca graduated from Belen High School in 1989. He enlisted in the United States Navy and served in the Gulf War. He earned his BS in business administration from the University of Phoenix and his JD from the University of New Mexico School of Law.

Career
While serving in the United States Navy, Baca as a nuclear operator on the USS Nimitz.

Baca operates his own legal practice in Los Lunas, New Mexico, where he specializes in Real Estate, Bankruptcy, Business, and Estate Law.

Baca was elected to the New Mexico Senate in 2016, defeating Democratic Majority Leader Michael S. Sanchez.

Baca was re-elected in 2020, once again defeating Michael S. Sanchez. On November 17, 2020, Baca was chosen as the new Republican senate minority leader.

References

External links
Official page at the New Mexico Legislature
Campaign site

Gregory A. Baca at Ballotpedia

1971 births
21st-century American politicians
Belen High School alumni
Hispanic and Latino American state legislators in New Mexico
Living people
New Mexico lawyers
Republican Party New Mexico state senators
People from Belen, New Mexico
United States Navy personnel of the Gulf War
United States Navy sailors
University of New Mexico School of Law alumni
University of Phoenix alumni